Organizational Behavior and Human Decision Processes is a bimonthly peer-reviewed scientific journal covering organizational behavior and psychology. It was established in 1966 as Organizational Behavior and Human Performance, obtaining its current name in 1985. It is published by Elsevier and the editor-in-chief is Maryam Kouchaki (Kellogg School of Management, Northwestern University). According to the Journal Citation Reports, the journal has a 2021 impact factor of 5.606.

References

External links

Organizational behavior
Organizational psychology journals
Cognitive science journals
Publications established in 1966
Monthly journals
English-language journals